Fred Cavayé (Rennes, 14 December 1967) is a French director and screenwriter.

He started working in the world of fashion as a photographer.

Filmography

Director

Short films
 1996: Jean-René
 1999: J
 2001: Chedope
 2003: À l'arraché
 2012: Les Infidèles – Le Prologue

Feature films
 2008: Anything for Her (Pour elle)
 2010: Point Blank (À bout portant)
 2014: Mea Culpa
 2016: Radin!
 2018: Nothing to Hide (Le Jeu)
 2021: Farewell, Mr. Haffmann (Adieu Monsieur Haffmann)

Script writer
 2008: Beauties at War (La guerre des Miss) by Patrice Leconte
 2010: The Next Three Days (Les trois prochains jours) by Paul Haggis (remake of Pour elle)

References

External links 

1967 births
Living people
French screenwriters
French film directors
French photographers
Mass media people from Rennes